The 2019–20 season is Levski Sofia's 99th season in the First League. This article shows player statistics and all matches (official and friendly) that the club has played during the 2019–20 season.

Transfers

In

Total spending: 400 000 €

Out

 

Total income: 1 417 000 € 

Net income: 1 017 000 €

Loans out

Squad

Updated on 14 June 2020.

Performance overview

Fixtures

Friendlies

Summer

Mid-season

Winter

Parva Liga

Preliminary stage

League table

Results summary

Results by round

Matches

Championship stage

League table

Results summary

Results by round

Matches

Bulgarian Cup

UEFA Europa League

First qualifying round

Second qualifying round

Squad statistics

|-
|colspan="14"|Players away from the club on loan:

|-
|colspan="14"|Players who left Levski Sofia during the season:

|}

References 

PFC Levski Sofia seasons
Levski Sofia